Fleet Operational Standards and Training (FOST) is a Royal Navy training organisation. FOST is the training organisation responsible for ensuring that Royal Navy and Royal Fleet Auxilliary vessels are fit to join the operational fleet.

Commander Fleet Operational Standards and Training Headquarters (COM FOST HQ) is the HQ from where FOST is run, and this is headed up by a Commodore.

History

A. Cecil Hampshire's "The Royal Navy Since 1945" writes that

[U]nder the system of Home Service, General Service, and Foreign Service commissions which was introduced in 1954, warships required to be re-manned with completely new crews more frequently than in the old days of "running" commissions. Thus in September 1958 under a Flag Officer Sea Training, special "shakedown" or settling in courses lasting seven weeks were started to train the crews of newly commissioned ships in operating their equipment and give them experience in dealing with every eventuality likely to be met with in subsequent service at home and abroad.

Portland was the selected location and by the time Hampshire wrote in the early 1970s, "warships from other NATO and Commonwealth countries and from foreign navies" were undertaking the same courses of training.

FOST's superior officer changed from Flag Officer Surface Flotilla to Commander-in-Chief Fleet.

As a result of the Royal Navy programme 'Fleet First', FOST became the single command responsible for all sea training. The submarine sea-training organisation came under FOST and surface ship training previously undertaken by Flag Officer Surface Flotilla and the squadron staffs also shifted to FOST.

FOST operates a pair of Eurocopter Dauphin helicopters to allow its instructors to join vessels with minimal delay during intense training periods. Plymouth Airport closed on 23 December 2011. The aircraft operate from HMS Raleigh in Cornwall but are based at Newquay.

As well as training Royal Navy personnel, it has also been an important source of revenue in training foreign naval crews to handle and fight their vessels, with around one third of its work used in this capacity.

In May 2020, Flag Officer Sea Training became Fleet Operational Sea Training and the position was taken up by a Commodore in the appointment of Commander Fleet Operational Sea Training (COM FOST).

Training regime

The main training and testing period is called Basic Operational Sea Training (BOST), which typically lasts six weeks. It combines surveys of the physical condition of the ship with tests of the crew's readiness for deployment, including a weekly war-fighting and damage control scenario known as a 'Thursday War'. BOST thus has elements of the US Navy's Board of Inspection and Survey (INSURV) and Composite Training Unit Exercise assessments. When  underwent a short version of BOST in 2012, comments from her sailors included "I've been through other exercises, inspections, and deployment and this was by far the hardest ... It was even more intense than INSURV".

Commanders 1958 - 2020

Flag Officer Sea Training
Flag Officers Sea Training included:
 Vice-Admiral William G. Crawford, September 1958-August 1960
 Vice-Admiral Sir Peter Gretton, August 1960-December 1961
 Rear-Admiral Horace R. Law, December 1961-May 1963
 Rear-Admiral Patrick U. Bayly, May 1963-April 1965
 Rear-Admiral Philip G. Sharp, April 1965-July 1967
 Rear-Admiral John C. Y. Roxburgh, July 1967-May 1969
 Rear-Admiral J. Anthony R. Troup, May 1969-March 1971
 Rear-Admiral E. Gerard N. Mansfield, March 1971-October 1972
 Rear-Admiral John O. Roberts, October 1972-April 1974
 Rear-Admiral James H. F. Eberle, April 1974-April 1975
 Rear-Admiral John R.S. Gerard-Pearse, April 1975-November 1976
 Rear-Admiral Gwynedd I. Pritchard, November 1976-November 1978
 Rear-Admiral Anthony J. Whetstone, November 1978-September 1980
 Rear-Admiral David M. Eckersley-Maslin, September 1980-April 1982
 Rear-Admiral John M. Webster, April 1982-May 1984
 Rear-Admiral Michael H. Livesay, May 1984-December 1985 
 Rear-Admiral Barry N. Wilson, December 1985-June 1987
 Rear-Admiral John F. Coward, June 1987-June 1988
 Rear-Admiral Roy T. Newman, June 1988-December 1989
 Rear-Admiral A. Bruce Richardson, December 1989-July 1991
 Rear-Admiral Michael C. Boyce, July 1991-September 1992
 Rear-Admiral John G. Tolhurst, September 1992-April 1996
 Rear-Admiral Peter M. Franklyn, April 1996-July 1997
 Rear-Admiral R. John Lippiett, July 1997-September 1999
 Rear-Admiral Alexander K. Backus, September 1999-November 2001
 Rear-Admiral James C. Rapp, November 2001-April 2004
 Rear-Admiral Roger S. Ainsley, April 2004-June 2006
 Rear-Admiral Anthony J. Rix, June 2006-May 2007
 Rear-Admiral Richard J. Ibbotson, May 2007-February 2009
 Rear-Admiral Christopher A. Snow, February 2009-July 2011
 Rear-Admiral Clive C. C. Johnstone, July 2011-April 2013
 Rear-Admiral Benjamin J. Key, April 2013-July 2015

Flag Officer Sea Training and Assistant Chief of the Naval Staff (Training) 
Post holders include:
 Rear-Admiral John R.H. Clink, July 2015-June 2018 
 Rear-Admiral William J. Warrender June 2018 – 2020

Commander Fleet Operational Sea Training 
 Commodore Andrew Stacey, circa June 2020

Notes

Further reading

External links 

 FOST 
 Naval Air Organisation, Flight International, 20 April 1951

Fleet Operational Sea Training
Naval education and training in the United Kingdom
Military units and formations established in 1958
1958 establishments in the United Kingdom